Tropical Storm Danielle was the only tropical storm to move through the Caribbean Sea in 1986. A short-lived cyclone, Danielle developed on September 7 to the east of the southern Lesser Antilles. Strengthening to peak winds of 60 mph (95 km/h), the storm moved through Saint Vincent and the Grenadines, where a rainband moved across the main island with hurricane-force gusts. Continuing westward, Danielle absorbed dry air from northern South America and dissipated on September 10.

The threat of Danielle prompted gale warnings in Barbados as well as Saint Vincent and the Grenadines. On the former island, wind gusts reached . On Saint Vincent, the winds caused a major power outage, while heavy rainfall left crop damage. Another rain system affected the country a few weeks later, and the combined monetary damage totaled $9.2 million (1986 USD, $18 million 2010 USD); 142 people had to seek shelter after their homes were destroyed, and a total of 436 dwellings were impacted to some degree. In Trinidad and Tobago, the outer rainbands produced flooding and mudslides. Further west, Danielle briefly threatened Jamaica, although it dissipated before affecting the island.

Meteorological history

Around September 1, a tropical wave moved off the western coast of Africa.

Initially, forecasters anticipated Danielle would strengthen further. As the storm moved through Saint Vincent and the Grenadines, a rainband north of the center contained winds of near hurricane force, which moved across the island of Saint Vincent. After maintaining peak winds for about 18 hours, Danielle began weakening in the eastern Caribbean Sea, due to entrainment of dry air from northern South America. Paralleling the northern coast of the continent, the circulation became dislocated from the convection. Late on September 9, the system weakened to tropical depression status, and the next day it dissipated in the western Caribbean. It was the only tropical cyclone in the Caribbean Sea during 1986.

Preparations and impact
Before Tropical Storm Danielle moved through the Lesser Antilles, a small-craft advisory was issued, and later, gale warnings were posted for Barbados as well as Saint Vincent and the Grenadines. On Saint Vincent, the threat of the storm forced the closure of the main commercial airport, as well as schools, businesses, and stores. Further west, Danielle briefly posed a threat to Jamaica, prompting officials in that country to issue a tropical storm watch. Two months earlier, the precursor to Tropical Storm Andrew killed 49 people on the island; to avoid a recurrence, the Jamaican government worked to evacuate fishermen from two small islands as a precaution.

As Danielle moved through the Lesser Antilles, a rainband struck the island of Saint Vincent with wind gusts of near hurricane-force. The winds caused a major power outage on the island, and destroyed the roofs of more than 30 houses. Elsewhere in the country, the combination of winds and heavy rains caused heavy crop damage. Twelve days after Danielle struck, a severe rainstorm affected Saint Vincent and the Grenadines. The combined disasters produced a damage total of $9.3 million (1986 USD, $18 million 2010 USD), the majority of it from crop damage. The two storms caused the deaths of 120 animals, although there were no human fatalities. In addition to the crop damage, the combined impact of the two storms left over 100 houses destroyed, with a total of 436 dwellings damaged; this forced 142 people to seek emergency shelter. Across the country, the heavy rainfall caused mudslides and flooding which disrupted the transportation and utility network.

During its passage, Danielle produced a  wind gust at the airport in Bridgetown, Barbados. A coast guard ship from Barbados ran aground into a reef in the southern Grenadines, but it was rescued. The flooding caused 27 landslides and destroyed 4 bridges. Damage in the country was estimated at $8 million (1986 TTD, $1.2 million 1986 USD).

See also

 Other tropical cyclones named Danielle

Notes

References

Danielle (1986)
Danielle
Danielle (1986)
Danielle (1986)
1986 in the Caribbean
Danielle